Viečiūnai is a small town in Alytus County in southern Lithuania. In 2021 it had a population of 1,788.

References

Towns in Lithuania
Towns in Alytus County
Druskininkai Municipality